Mythimna is a genus of moths in the family Noctuidae described by Ferdinand Ochsenheimer in 1816.

Species

 Mythimna abdita Hreblay & Yoshimatsu, 1998
 Mythimna accurata Philpott, 1917
 Mythimna acontosema Turner, 1903
 Mythimna adultera Schaus, 1894
 Mythimna aenictopa D. S. Fletcher, 1961
 Mythimna albipuncta Denis & Schiffermüller, 1775 – white-point
 Mythimna albiradiosa Eversmann, 1852
 Mythimna albiviata Hampson, 1913
 Mythimna albivitta Hampson, 1891
 Mythimna albomarginata Wileman & South 1920
 Mythimna albostriata Hreblay & Yoshimatsu, 1998
 Mythimna albovenosa Hreblay, 1999
 Mythimna algirica Oberthür, 1918
 Mythimna alopecuri Boisduval, 1840
 Mythimna amblycasis Meyrick, 1899
 Mythimna amlaki Laporte, 1984
 Mythimna anderreggii Boisduval, 1840
 Mythimna angustipennis Saalmüller, 1891
 Mythimna ankaratra Rungs, 1955
 Mythimna anthracoscelis Boursin, 1962
 Mythimna argentata Hreblay & Yoshimatsu, 1998
 Mythimna argentea Yoshimatsu, 1994
 Mythimna argentifera Hreblay, 1998
 Mythimna argentivena Calora, 1966
 Mythimna arizanensis Wileman, 1915
 Mythimna atrata Remm & Viidalepp, 1979
 Mythimna aurotrigoni Hreblay & Yoshimatsu, 1998
 Mythimna bani Sugi, 1977
 Mythimna bicolorata Plante, 1992
 Mythimna bicristata Berio, 1939
 Mythimna bifasciata Moore, 1888
 Mythimna binigrata Warren, 1912
 Mythimna biscornuta Hreblay, Legrain & Yoshimatsu, 1998
 Mythimna bistrigata Moore, 1881
 Mythimna biundulata Motschulsky, 1860
 Mythimna borbonensis Guillermet, 1996
 Mythimna borneana Yoshimatsu, 1994
 Mythimna brandti Boursin, 1963
 Mythimna breciva Hreblay & Legrain, 1998
 Mythimna brunneicoccinea Calora, 1966
 Mythimna caelebs Grünberg, 1910
 Mythimna cameroni Hreblay, 1998
 Mythimna cana Hampson, 1891
 Mythimna celebina Hreblay, 1998
 Mythimna changi Sugi, 1992
 Mythimna chiangmai Hreblay & Yoshimatsu, 1998
 Mythimna chosenicola Bryk, 1949
 Mythimna circulus Saalmüller, 1880
 Mythimna clarior Hreblay, 1993
 Mythimna combinata Walker, [1857]
 Mythimna comma Linnaeus, 1761 – shoulder-striped wainscot
 Mythimna congrua Hübner, [1817]
 Mythimna conigera Denis & Schiffermüller, 1775 – brown-line bright-eye
 Mythimna consanguis Guenée, 1852
 Mythimna consimilis Moore, 1881
 Mythimna convecta Walker, 1857 – common armyworm
 Mythimna conversa Hreblay & Yoshimatsu, 1998
 Mythimna cryptargyrea Bethune-Baker, 1905
 Mythimna cuneilinea Draudt, 1950
 Mythimna cuneolata Calora, 1966
 Mythimna cunyada Franclemont, 1951
 Mythimna curvata Leech, 1900
 Mythimna daemona Hreblay & Legrain, 1996
 Mythimna dasuta Hampson, 1905
 Mythimna decisissima Walker, 1865
 Mythimna denticula Hampson, 1893
 Mythimna deserticola Bartel, 1902
 Mythimna dharma Moore, 1881
 Mythimna discilinea Draudt, 1950
 Mythimna distincta Moore, 1881
 Mythimna divergens Butler, 1878
 Mythimna duplex Rungs, 1955
 Mythimna elisa Berio, 1962
 Mythimna empyrea Hudson, 1918
 Mythimna ensata Yoshimatsu, 1998
 Mythimna epieixelus Rothschild, 1920
 Mythimna eucrossa Meyrick, 1927
 Mythimna evoei Laporte, 1974
 Mythimna expulsa Hreblay, 1996
 Mythimna exsanguis Guenée, 1852
 Mythimna fallaciosa Rungs, 1955
 Mythimna fasciata Moore, 1881
 Mythimna favicolor Barrett, 1896 – Mathew's wainscot
 Mythimna ferrago Fabricius, 1787 – clay
 Mythimna ferrilinea Leech, 1900
 Mythimna flavalba Berio, 1970
 Mythimna flavostigma Bremer, 1861
 Mythimna foranea Draudt, 1950
 Mythimna formosana Butler, 1880
 Mythimna formosicola Yoshimatsu, 1994
 Mythimna franclemonti Calora, 1966
 Mythimna fraterna Moore, 1888
 Mythimna funerea Philpott, 1927
 Mythimna furcifera Moore, 1882
 Mythimna glaciata Yoshimatsu, 1998
 Mythimna godavariensis Yoshimoto, 1992
 Mythimna goniosigma Hampson, 1905
 Mythimna graditornalis Berio, 1970
 Mythimna grandis Butler, 1878
 Mythimna grata Hreblay, 1996
 Mythimna griseofasciata Moore, 1881
 Mythimna groulayi Philpott, 1921
 Mythimna guanyuana Chang, 1991
 Mythimna hackeri Hreblay & Yoshimatsu, 1996
 Mythimna hamifera Walker, 1862
 Mythimna hannemanni Yoshimatsu, 1991
 Mythimna heimi Rungs, 1955
 Mythimna hirashimai Yoshimatsu, 1994
 Mythimna honeyi Yoshimatsu, 1990
 Mythimna hypophaea Hampson, 1905
 Mythimna idisana Franclemont, 1951
 Mythimna ignifera Hreblay, 1998
 Mythimna ignita Hampson, 1905
 Mythimna ignorata Hreblay & Yoshimatsu, 1998
 Mythimna ignota Hreblay, 1998
 Mythimna impura Hübner, 1808 – smoky wainscot
 Mythimna inanis Oberthür, 1880
 Mythimna infrargyrea Saalmüller, 1891
 Mythimna inornata Leech, 1889
 Mythimna insularis Butler, 1880
 Mythimna intermediata Yoshimatsu, 1990
 Mythimna intertexta Chang, 1991
 Mythimna intolerabilis Hreblay, 1993
 Mythimna iodochra Sugi, 1982
 Mythimna irrorata Moore, 1881
 Mythimna javacorna Hreblay & Legrain, 1998
 Mythimna kambaitiana Berio, 1973
 Mythimna kerala Hreblay & Moore, 1999
 Mythimna khasiensis Hreblay & Legrain, 1998
 Mythimna l-album Linnaeus, 1767 – L-album wainscot
 Mythimna laevusta Berio, 1955
 Mythimna languida Walker, 1858
 Mythimna larga Hreblay, 1998
 Mythimna larseni Wiltshire, 1985
 Mythimna lasiomera Hampson, 1905
 Mythimna laxa Hreblay & Yoshimatsu, 1996
 Mythimna legraini Plante, 1992
 Mythimna lepida Hreblay, Legrain & Yoshimatsu, 1996
 Mythimna leucosphenia Bethune-Baker, 1905
 Mythimna liebherri Yoshimatsu, 1991
 Mythimna lineatipes Moore, 1881
 Mythimna lipara Wileman & West 1928
 Mythimna lishana Chang, 1991
 Mythimna litoralis Curtis, 1827 –- shore wainscot
 Mythimna longivittata Berio, 1940
 Mythimna loreyimima Lower, 1900 – sugar cane armyworm
 Mythimna lucbana Calora, 1966
 Mythimna lucida Yoshimatsu & Hreblay, 1996
 Mythimna macrosaris Meyrick, 1899
 Mythimna madensis Berio, 1955
 Mythimna manopi Hreblay, 1998
 Mythimna martoni Yoshimatsu & Legrain, 2001
 Mythimna maxima Hreblay, 1998
 Mythimna mediana Moore, 1881
 Mythimna mediofusca Hampson, 1891
 Mythimna melania Staudinger, 1889
 Mythimna mesotrosta Püngeler, 1900
 Mythimna metaphaea Hampson, 1905
 Mythimna milloti Rungs, 1955
 Mythimna mobilia Howes, 1946
 Mythimna modesta Moore, 1881
 Mythimna moinieri Plante, 1993
 Mythimna mollis Berio, 1974
 Mythimna monticola Sugi, 1958
 Mythimna moorei Swinhoe, 1902
 Mythimna moriuttii Yoshimatsu & Hreblay, 1996
 Mythimna multipunctata Hampson, 1918
 Mythimna munda Philpott, 1917
 Mythimna munnari Hreblay, 1999
 Mythimna mvakoumelensis Laporte, 1973
 Mythimna nainica Moore, 1881
 Mythimna naumanni Yoshimatsu & Hreblay, 1998
 Mythimna nepalina Hreblay & Yoshimatsu, 1996
 Mythimna nepos Leech, 1900
 Mythimna nigrilinea Leech, 1889
 Mythimna obscura Moore, 1882
 Mythimna obscurographa Hreblay, 1999
 Mythimna obsecrata Meyrick, 1914
 Mythimna obsoleta Hübner, 1803 –- obscure wainscot
 Mythimna opaca Staudinger, 1900
 Mythimna opada Calora, 1966
 Mythimna operosa Saalmüller, 1891
 Mythimna osseogrisea Berio, 1973
 Mythimna oxygala Grote, 1881
 Mythimna pakdala Calora, 1966
 Mythimna pallens Linnaeus, 1758 – common wainscot
 Mythimna pallidicosta Hampson, 1894
 Mythimna panarista D. S. Fletcher, 1963
 Mythimna parmata Philpott, 1926
 Mythimna pastea Hampson, 1905
 Mythimna pastearis Draudt, 1950
 Mythimna pastellina Hreblay & Legrain, 1996
 Mythimna percisa Moore, 1888
 Mythimna perirrorata Warren, 1913
 Mythimna phaeopasta Hampson, 1907
 Mythimna phlebitis Püngeler, 1904
 Mythimna placida Butler, 1878
 Mythimna plantei Hreblay & Yoshimatsu, 1995
 Mythimna probenota Howes, 1945
 Mythimna prominens Walker, 1856
 Mythimna proxima Leech, 1900
 Mythimna pseudoformosana Robinson, 1975
 Mythimna pseudotacuna Berio, 1962
 Mythimna pudorina Denis & Schiffermüller, 1775 – striped wainscot
 Mythimna pulchra Snellen, [1886]
 Mythimna punctulata Blanchard, 1852
 Mythimna purpurpatagis Chang, 1991
 Mythimna pyrausta Hampson, 1913
 Mythimna quasimodo Hreblay, 1998
 Mythimna radiata Bremer, 1861
 Mythimna renimaculata Hreblay & Legrain, 1996
 Mythimna reversa Moore, 1884
 Mythimna reealis Cusanelli, 1996
 Mythimna riparia (Rambur, 1829)
 Mythimna roraimae Franclemont, 1951
 Mythimna rubida Hreblay, Legrain & Yoshimatsu, 1996
 Mythimna rubrisecta Hampson, 1905
 Mythimna rudis Moore, 1888
 Mythimna rufescentalis Poole, 1989
 Mythimna rufipennis Butler, 1878
 Mythimna rufistrigosa Moore, 1881
 Mythimna rufulosa Wiltshire, 1986
 Mythimna rushanensis Yoshimatsu, 1994
 Mythimna rutilitincta Hreblay & Yoshimatsu, 1996
 Mythimna salebrosa Butler, 1878
 Mythimna sapiens Meyrick, 1929
 Mythimna sassanidica Hacker, 1986
 Mythimna saucesa Pinker, 1963
 Mythimna scirpi Duponchel, [1839]
 Mythimna scottii Butler, 1886
 Mythimna semicana Pagenstecher, 1900
 Mythimna separata Walker, 1865 – northern armyworm
 Mythimna sequax Franclemont, 1951
 Mythimna serradaguae Wolff, 1977
 Mythimna siamensis Hreblay, 1998
 Mythimna sicula Treitschke, 1835
 Mythimna sigma Draudt, 1950
 Mythimna similissima Hreblay & Yoshimatsu, 1996
 Mythimna simplex Leech, 1889
 Mythimna sinensis Hampson, 1909
 Mythimna sinuosa Moore, 1882
 Mythimna snelleni Hreblay, 1996
 Mythimna sokotrensis Hreblay, 1996
 Mythimna speciosa Yoshimatsu, 1991
 Mythimna stolida Leech, 1889
 Mythimna straminea Treitschke, 1825 – southern wainscot
 Mythimna striatella Draudt, 1950
 Mythimna stueningi Plante, 1993
 Mythimna suavina Hreblay, 1998
 Mythimna subplacida Sugi, 1977
 Mythimna subsignata Moore, 1881
 Mythimna taiwana Wileman, 1912
 Mythimna tangala Felder & Rogenhofer, 1874
 Mythimna tengeri Hreblay, 1999
 Mythimna tessellum Draudt, 1950
 Mythimna thailandica Hreblay, 1998
 Mythimna thomasi Hacker, Hreblay & Plante 1993
 Mythimna tibetensis Hreblay, 1998
 Mythimna tincta Walker, 1858
 Mythimna toumodi Laporte, 1978
 Mythimna transversata Draudt, 1950
 Mythimna tricorna Hreblay, Legrain & Yoshimatsu, 1998
 Mythimna tricuspis Draudt, 1950
 Mythimna turca Linnaeus, 1761 – double line
 Mythimna umbrigera Saalmüller, 1891
 Mythimna uncinatus Gaede, 1916
 Mythimna undicilia Walker, 1856
 Mythimna undina Draudt, 1950
 Mythimna unipuncta Haworth, 1809 – white-speck
 Mythimna uruma Sugi, 1970
 Mythimna usta Hampson, 1902
 Mythimna v-album Hampson, 1891
 Mythimna velutina Eversmann, 1846
 Mythimna viettei Rungs, 1955
 Mythimna vilis Gaede, 1916
 Mythimna vittata Hampson, 1891
 Mythimna vitellina Hübner, 1808 – delicate
 Mythimna vuattouxi Laporte, 1973
 Mythimna yukonensis Hampson, 1911 (alternative spelling Mythimna yuconensis)
 Mythimna yuennana Draudt, 1950

References
 Animal Behavior 62: 349–368.
 

 
Mythimnini
Taxa named by Ferdinand Ochsenheimer
Insect pests of millets